Psycho is a 2020 Indian Tamil-language psychological thriller film written and directed by Mysskin. The film was produced by Arun Mozhi Manickam under Double Meaning Production. The film stars Udhayanidhi Stalin, Nithya Menen, Aditi Rao Hydari, and debutant Rajkumar Pitchumani, while Renuka, Singampuli, Ram, Aadukalam Naren, and Shaji Chen play supporting roles. Ilaiyaraaja composed the soundtrack of the film, with cinematography by Tanvir Mir and editing by N. Arunkumar. Production began in September 2018.

The film released worldwide on 24 January 2020.

Plot
Gautham is a blind musician, who is in love with a RJ named Dagini. After multiple attempts by Gautham, Dagini asks him to meet her at a place that she will be talking about in her radio session. Gautham listens to the radio all day and manages to find the place, which is a train station. Hopefully waiting for him, Dagini sees the psycho-killer and tries to escape, but the psycho manages to sedate her. Gautham reaches the place in time but cannot save  her due to his blindness. However, using his sense of smell, he realizes that something is wrong. The next day, the police meet to Gautham and extract information from him. A total of 14 girls were abducted, 13 of whom got murdered, and the recently kidnapped Dagini. 

Gautham realizes that the police cannot find anything, and decides to seek out and save Dagini on his own terms. The psycho is about to behead Dagini, but notices that there is no sense of fear in her. When asked for the reason, she replies that Gautham will find her within a week regardless of her death and that the psycho will be answering for his crimes soon. The psycho leaves her chained to a wall and accepts that as a challenge. Gautham uses various methods to find the killer with the help of Kamala, a handicapped ex-cop, who was previously dealing with the case. They deduce that the psycho must be a rich man who owns pig farms using the smell from the decayed bodies of the murdered girls. Realizing that Gautham is getting closer to him, the psycho goes on a killing spree. 

Gautham, Kamala, and their associates all visit and enquire the owners of pig farms in the area, but they have failed in their attempts. Depressed, Gautham goes to his house and stays there alone. The psycho visits him, and Gautham acknowledges his presence. However, Gautham's friend Rajanayakam defends him and tries to chase down the psycho in his car. Unfortunately, the psycho hides himself in a dense area of tall grass and finally manages to kill Rajanayakam. The next day, Gautham mourns over the death of his friend and plans to drop his plan due to a large number of people's deaths. Later, Kamala reveals that she had prior notice that the killer had gone to a college function. With regained hope, they all go back to the college and look at the recordings during that day. 

They manage to find someone suspicious, but his face got blurred. However, they notice a college staff sitting beside him. Using relevant information from him, they manage to find the killer. In the meantime, Dagini manages to go around the psycho's lair and sees a jailed woman and a dead cop's corpse. She reveals to her that the psycho was her former student and used to masturbate, so she used to beat him 60 times every day, for all 365 days in a year for his mistake. Around 11:45 PM, Gautham reaches the psycho's lair. The psycho is about to behead Dagini, the intruder alarms get activated. The enraged psycho runs to kill Gautham, but eventually, Gautham manages to cuff the psycho's leg. Gautham later runs and rescues Dagini. They both manage to run away. 

However, the psycho begs out to his teacher, where Dagini sees the light in him and places the keys to the cuff a few meters in front of him. Later, they both escape together with Kamala. The psycho is about to take the key, but the imprisoned teacher takes the key and swallows it, trying to punish him. The psycho gets infuriated and tears her stomach to get the key. He later releases himself and runs to find them both, but they escape. Later on, it is evident that Dagini has been affected by Stockholm Syndrome, as she sympathizes with the psychopath when questioned by the press and refuses to consider him a killer but understands his innocent heart filled with pain and she were his mother or sister, she would have cared for him so that he would not have become the killer that he was. The psycho sees the interview and realizes his mistakes after finally feeling loved by someone, where he jumps off the cliff with a smile on his face.

Cast

Production

Mysskin decided to cast Udhayanidhi Stalin in the lead role. Under the banner of Arun Mozhi Manickam's Double Meaning Productions, Mysskin finalized a cast of Aditi Rao Hydari, Nithya Menon, Rajkumar Pitchumani, and Ram,  while Ilaiyaraaja, who worked on the director's previous films Nandalala and Onaayum Aattukkuttiyum, was signed as music composer. The shoot of the film began in early September 2018, with a first look promotional poster released later that month, revealing the title of the project to be Psycho. A second schedule of the film was completed in early December 2018 after being shot in hill-towns across Tamil Nadu.

In a turn of events, P. C. Sreeram was replaced by his assistant, Tanvir Mir as the film's cinematographer, while Sreeram further mentioning that Tanvir will be credited as the film's cinematographer.

Music

The soundtrack of the film was composed by Ilaiyaraaja, collaborating with actor Udhayanidhi for the first time and director Mysskin for the third time. The audio rights were secured by Sony Music India.

The film's first single, titled Unna Nenachu which is sung by Sid Sriram (on his first collaboration with Ilaiyaraaja) and lyrics by Kabilan, was released by director Vetrimaaran on 18 November 2019.

The songs received extremely positive response from both the audience and critics upon its release. Film critics credited Ilaiyaraaja's music for its major contribution towards the film's success.

Release
The teaser was released on 25 October 2019 by director Mani Ratnam. The 70-second teaser reveals that the film is a murder mystery and Udhayanidhi plays a blind man in the film.

Earlier, the producer announced that the film will be releasing worldwide on 27 December 2019, but they decided to release the film on 24 January 2020 instead in order to increase screen counts and for wider pan-Indian reach of the film.

Reception 
The Times of India gave 3 out of 5 stars and wrote "Not a conventional serial killer film". The Hindu wrote "Mysskin’s latest bears no similarity to the 1960 movie, apart from featuring a psychopath at the centre (who, oddly, looks like the terrifying Norman Bates) and the playful macabre tone".

References

External links

2020 psychological thriller films
2020s Tamil-language films
Films directed by Mysskin
Tamil-language psychological thriller films
2020s serial killer films
Films scored by Ilaiyaraaja
Films about Buddhism
Films shot in Coimbatore
Indian serial killer films